Floaters is the debut studio album recorded by American R&B group The Floaters, released in 1977 on the ABC label.

Commercial performance
The album peaked at No. 1 on the R&B albums chart. It also reached No. 10 on the Billboard 200. The album features the single "Float On", which peaked at No. 1 on the Hot Soul Singles and UK Singles Charts, and No. 2  on the Billboard Hot 100. The single "You Don't Have to Say You Love Me", originally recorded by Dusty Springfield, charted at No. 28 on the Hot Soul Singles chart.

Track listing

Personnel
The Floaters
Larry Cunningham – tenor
Paul Mitchell – baritone
Charles Clark – tenor
Ralph Mitchell – tenor

Musicians
Kenny Goodman – guitar
Buster Marbury – drums
Brimstone Ingram – piano, Fender Rhodes
Guy Hutson – bass
Dennis Coffey – guitar, sitar
Marvin Willis – trumpet
Larry Nozero – balto saxophone, flute
Jack Brokensha – vibraphone, bells
Lorenzo "Bag of Tricks" Brown – congas
Gary Schunk – clarinet, ARP synthesizer
Brandye, James Mitchell – background vocals

Charts
Album

Singles

See also
List of number-one R&B albums of 1977 (U.S.)

References

External links
 

1977 debut albums
ABC Records albums